Vera Storozheva (born 7 September 1958) is a Russian actress and film director. She has directed nine films since 2002. Her 2007 film Travelling with Pets won the Golden George at the 29th Moscow International Film Festival.

Selected filmography
 The Asthenic Syndrome (1990)
 Three Stories (1997)
 The French Guy (2004)
 Travelling with Pets (2007)
 My Boyfriend Is an Angel (2011)
 Mariya. Spasti Moskvu (2021)

References

External links

1958 births
Living people
Russian film actresses
Russian film directors
20th-century Russian actresses
People from Troitsk, Chelyabinsk Oblast
Russian women film directors